In Chile, nationwide elections for the presidency, parliament, regional offices, and municipal positions are held. The independent Electoral Service (or Servel) supervises the electoral process, and the winners are proclaimed by the Election Certification Court. This court is composed of four members from Chile's Supreme Court and one former legislator chosen by the court.

Schedule

Election

Inauguration

Electorate

Citizens of Chile and foreign residents with legal residency of at least five years who are 18 years or older on election day are eligible to vote. All eligible citizens are automatically registered, and voting is compulsory. Between 2012 and 2023, voting was voluntary. Since 2014, Chileans have been able to vote overseas in presidential elections (including primaries) and referendums.

Presidential elections

Presidential elections elect a president, who serves as the chief of state and head of government for a period of four years. Non-consecutive re-election is permitted.

The president is directly elected by an absolute majority of valid votes (excluding null and blank votes). If no candidate obtains such a majority, a runoff election is held between the two candidates with the most votes. Before 1989, the president was confirmed by Congress if elected by a simple majority.

Each legally operating political party may nominate one of its members as a candidate. Independent candidates must gain the support of a number of independent electors before registering their candidacy. The number of signatures needed is equal to at least 0.5% of the number of people who voted in the most recent Chamber of Deputies election. For the 2013 election, the number was 36,318 signatures.

According to the Constitution, presidential elections take place on the third Sunday of November in the year before the current president's term expires. If necessary, a runoff election is held on the fourth Sunday following the first election. The president is sworn in on the day the incumbent president's term expires.

Before 2011, presidential elections were held 90 days before the current president's term expired. If that day was not a Sunday, the election was moved to the following Sunday. If necessary, a runoff election was held 30 days after the first election, following the Sunday rule. Since 1990, the president has taken office on March 11, so elections were held on or after December 11 of the previous year.

Parliamentary elections

Electoral system until 2017

Chile's bicameral Congress is composed of a Chamber of Deputies (the lower house) and a Senate (the upper house). The country is divided into 60 electoral districts for the Chamber of Deputies and 19 senatorial constituencies for the Senate. (See Electoral divisions of Chile for details.) Each electoral district and senatorial constituency directly elects two representatives, totaling 120 deputies and 38 senators. Chile is unique in that it was the only country in the world with nationwide two-seat electoral districts.

Deputies serve a four-year term and senators serve and eight-year term. Both deputies and senators are eligible for unlimited reelection. Every four years, half the Senate is replaced. In the first Senate after the restoration of democracy in 1990, senators from odd-numbered regions served a four-year term (1990–1994), while senators from even-numbered regions and the Santiago Metropolitan Region served an eight-year term (1990–1998). The senators from odd-numbered regions elected in 1993 served the standard eight-year term (1994–2002).

According to the Constitution, parliamentary elections must be held in conjunction with presidential elections.

Candidates may register with either the support of a political party or a group of citizens. Party affiliation is optional for candidates supported by a political party, but candidates supported by a group of citizens must not be affiliated with any political party and must collect signatures from independent electors. The number of signatures required is at least 0.5% of the total votes cast in the last Chamber of Deputies election in that electoral district (for a lower-chamber seat) or last Senate election in that senatorial constituency (for a Senate seat).

Two or more political parties can form an alliance, known as a "pact," to present up to two candidates per electoral district or senatorial constituency. The candidates do not have to be affiliated with any of the parties in the pact, but they cannot be affiliated with a political party outside of the pact.

Political parties that are not part of a pact may present up to two candidates per electoral district or senatorial constituency, and the candidates must be affiliated with that party.

In each electoral district and senatorial constituency election, the two entities (pact, political party not part of a pact, or independent candidate not part of a pact) with the most votes each receive one seat, with the leading candidate in each entity taking the seat. To win both seats, the leading entity must receive at least two times as many votes as the second-leading entity. This is a rare application of the D'Hondt method, as only two seats are allocated per electoral division.

Criticism

This binomial voting system was established by the military dictatorship that ruled Chile until 1990, limiting the proportional system in place until 1973 to two seats per district or constituency. The dictatorship used gerrymandering to create electoral districts that favored rightist parties, with a positive bias towards the more conservative rural areas of the country. The vote-to-seat ratio was lower in districts that supported Pinochet in the 1988 plebiscite and higher in those with the strongest opposition. None of the newly created districts had a margin of more than 2-to-1 in the plebiscite. The authoritarian regime also made it difficult to change the system, requiring a three-fifths majority in both chambers to modify it.

Members of the Concert of Parties for Democracy believe that the system undermines their majority in Congress and exaggerates the representation of the right. The right views the system as necessary for the country's stability and to encourage the creation of large coalitions. The left sees the system as undemocratic, denying representation to candidates outside the two main coalitions.

Changes to electoral system in 2017

A law reforming the electoral system was published in May 2015. It decreased the number of electoral districts to 28, which were formed by merging existing districts, and reduced the number of senatorial constituencies to 15, with one for each region. Each electoral district elects between three and eight deputies, while each region elects between two and five senators. The number of lawmakers in each chamber was increased, to 155 in the lower chamber, and 50 in the Senate. The D'Hondt method remains in use to determine the winners. The new system was introduced in the 2017 general elections and significantly changed the composition of Congress.

Regional elections

Note: This section is outdated. The regional boards were directly elected on 17 November 2013 for a period of four years starting on 11 March 2014.

Each region in Chile is governed by an Intendant (Intendente), who is appointed by the President of the Republic and assisted by a regional board made up of advisors (consejeros).

Advisors are elected by each region's municipal councilmen, who form electoral colleges per regional province. Each region is allotted two advisors per province, plus an additional 10 in regions with up to 1 million inhabitants or 14 more in regions with over 1 million people. These additional advisors are apportioned to provinces in relation to their share of the regional population in the latest census using the D'Hondt method. The candidate who receives the most votes wins within each province. However, if two or more candidates run as a list within a province, the winners are determined using the D'Hondt method.

Advisors serve four-year terms and can be reelected indefinitely. Elections take place 15 days after the councilmen take office, and the newly elected advisors are sworn in 60 days after their election. The last election took place on December 21, 2008, and the elected advisors took office on February 19, 2009.

In October 2009, the Constitution was modified to allow advisors to be elected directly by universal suffrage. They will serve for four years with the possibility of reelection, and the number of advisors will be proportional to the region's population and area in relation to the country. However, the law regulating regional administrations has not been modified to reflect this change, so the date of the first such election is uncertain.

In December 2012, a temporary article was added to the Constitution suspending the election that was scheduled for December 21, 2012, and extending the mandate of the incumbent advisors to March 11, 2014. The same article states that the advisors' first direct election will take place on November 17, 2013, coinciding with the presidential and parliamentary election), as long as the necessary changes to the law are published before July 20, 2013.

In February 2018, a new law established the democratic election of regional governors, stating that they will be elected at the same time as mayors, councillors, and regional boards. However, the regional boards will only be elected simultaneously with these offices in October 2024, maintaining the current schedule, which stated that the next regional boards elections will take place in November 2021, along with the presidential and parliamentary elections.

Municipal elections

Voters directly elect one mayor and a number of councilmen per municipality. Mayors are elected by a simple majority, while councilmen seats (ranging from 6 to 10, depending on the municipality's registered voters) are decided using proportional representation, similar to the D'Hondt method. Since 2004, mayors and councilmen have been elected in separate ballots.

According to the Constitution, councilmen have four-year mandates and can be reelected indefinitely. Mayors also have a four-year mandate and can be reelected indefinitely, as set by the law. The election of mayors and councilmen takes place on the last Sunday of October and they take office on December 6 of that year.

The last election was held on October 23, 2016 (moved from its original date of 30 October to avoid conflicting with a four-day holiday), and the next election is scheduled for October 25, 2020.

Referendums

National

The Constitution provides for binding referendums (plebiscito) only in the case where a constitutional reform passed by Congress is completely vetoed by the President and then confirmed by Congress by a two-thirds majority of each chamber. In such an occurrence, the President has the authority to either sign the reform into law or call for a referendum. To date, the President has not exercised this power.

Communal
The Constitution allows municipalities to hold binding referendums to address various local issues. Referendums can be initiated by the mayor with council approval, by a two-thirds majority of council members, or by residents who represent 10% of the total voter turnout in the most recent municipal election.

To date, only one such referendum has taken place. It was held in Peñalolén on December 11, 2011, and was used to determine a new zoning plan for the commune.

Primaries

Legal primaries

There is a system of government-run primaries to select candidates for president, senator, deputy, and mayor. The primaries for president, senator, and deputy are held concurrently.

Primaries can take place within a single political party or within a group of parties, known as a "pact." Independent candidates may participate in primaries with the backing of a political party or a pact. However, independents are not eligible to be candidates in primaries for congressional seats if the political party supporting the candidate is not part of a pact. Political parties may form separate pacts for presidential and parliamentary primaries. Political parties and pacts are free to decide whether to allow independent electors or electors affiliated with other political parties to participate in their primaries. However, independent electors must be allowed to vote in a presidential primary that includes an independent candidate.

According to the Constitution, primary results are legally binding for political parties that use them. Candidates who lose in the primaries are ineligible to run for the same office in the general election, unless the winning candidate dies or resigns before the registration deadline.

The law states that primaries take place on the twentieth Sunday before the election. The first legal primaries for president and deputy took place on June 30, 2013, and the first legal mayoral primaries took place on June 19, 2016.

Extralegal primaries

Presidential
The Concertación coalition selected its candidate for President of the Republic through primaries in 1993, 1999 and 2009 (in 2005, they were canceled after one of two contenders quit the race). The Juntos Podemos pact selected its presidential candidate in a primary in 2009.

Parliamentary
Throughout 2013, the Concertación parties organized primaries to select some of their candidates for seats in Congress.

Mayoral
The Concertación organized primary elections on April 1, 2012, in over 40% of communes to select its candidates for mayor for the October 28, 2012 municipal election.

Voting

For Chileans, the only document required to vote is a national identity card that is current up to a year before the election or a current passport. Foreigners must present their identity cards in order to vote. The voting process is secret and in-person. Before voting, a voter must present their identity card or passport to verify their registration at the polling place, then sign the registration book. The voter will then receive the ballot(s) with the names, numbers, and party affiliations of all candidates, and go to a voting booth. Using a provided graphite pencil, the voter marks their choices by drawing a vertical line over the printed horizontal line next to the chosen candidate. Marking two or more choices nullifies the vote, and if no candidate is marked, the vote is considered "blank." After marking the ballot(s), the voter returns them to the polling officer, who removes the serial number, and the voter places them in the appropriate ballot box(es). Finally, the voter's national identity card/passport is returned to them.

Most polling places are located in schools or sporting centers and security is provided by the armed forces and uniformed police (Carabineros) before, during, and after the elections. Since 2012, polling stations have been mixed-sex.

Suffrage
The state of suffrage in Chile since 1833:

 From 1833: Men over 25, if single, or 21, if married, able to read and write, and owning property or capital of a certain value fixed by law. (Art. 8 of the 1833 Constitution)
 The 1884 Election Law drops the ownership requirement for men and explicitly bans women from being registered.
 From 1925: Men over 21 able to read and write. (Art. 7 of the 1925 Constitution)
 From 1934: Men over 21 able to read and write (general registry); women over 25 able to read and write (municipal registry, i.e. limited to local elections). (Law No. 5,357)
 From 1949: Men and women over 21 able to read and write. (Law No. 9,292)
 From 1970 until today: Men and women over 18. (Law No. 17,284 modifying Art. 7 of the 1925 Constitution; Art. 13 of the 1980 Constitution)

No Chilean Constitution has ever explicitly prohibited women from voting. The term "chilenos" used in various constitutions to refer to those with the right to vote means both "Chilean men" and "Chilean people", so no constitutional amendment was necessary to grant women the right to vote.

Turnout
Election turnout since 1925.

Note: Since 2017, enrollment and turnout figures for presidential elections, presidential primaries and plebiscites include voters from abroad.

Notes: a Excludes 200,638 affiliates from non-participating political parties. b Held in 10 out of 60 electoral districts. c Held in 93 out of 346 communes. d Excludes affiliates from non-participating political parties. h Excludes 273,017 affiliates and 445,722 'pending' affiliates from non-participating political parties, and 21,270 electors from abroad. j Held in 7 out of 28 electoral districts. k Excludes affiliates and 'pending' affiliates from non-participating political parties. m Revised provisional results. n Held in 36 out of 346 communes. o Provisional results including 99.91% of ballot boxes. p Provisional results including 99.84% of ballot boxes. q Held in 13 out of 16 regions. r Provisional results including 99.99% of ballot boxes.
 Voting Age Population: An estimation of the country's population over the age of 21 (1952–1969) and 18 (1970–2013) on the day of the election. Source:  Note: The UN provides data estimated for July 1 of each year disaggregated by age. Linear interpolation was applied to obtain the population for election day. For 2016 mayoral primaries and 19 November 2017 elections: COMUNAS: ACTUALIZACIÓN POBLACIÓN 2002-2012 Y PROYECCIONES 2013-2020, National Statistics Institute of Chile. For 2020 elections: Estimaciones y proyecciones 1992-2050, país, National Statistics Institute of Chile. Note: VAP is for June 30.
 Source: Electoral Service (1925-1973; 1988-2010; 2012; 2013; 2016 (primaries); 2016 (municipal); 2017 (presidential primaries); 2017 (lower-chamber primaries and 19 November 2017 elections); 2021 (regional governors)).
 Source: Electoral Service (1925-1969 and 1973 as a percentage only; 1970; 1988-2012; 2013 (primaries); 2013 (regional boards); 2013 (deputies); 2013 (Senate); 2013 (president); 2016 (primaries); 2016 (municipal); 2017). Values for 1952–1969 and 1973 derived from columns 3, 4 and 7.
 Turnout as a percentage of the voting age population.

See also
 Electoral calendar
 Electoral system

References

External links

Archive of recent election results (Chilean Ministry of Interior)
Archive of past elections
Chile's Electoral Service (Servel)
Adam Carr's Election Archive